Dennis Houston (born April 24, 1999) is an American football wide receiver for the Dallas Cowboys of the National Football League (NFL). He played college football at Western Illinois.

Early life and high school
Houston grew up in San Antonio, Texas and attended Earl Warren High School.

College career
Houston began his college football career at Houston Baptist. He caught 33 passes for 362 yards as a freshman. After the season, Houston transferred to Fullerton College and had 360 receiving yards and three touchdowns. He then transferred to Western Illinois for his remaining collegiate eligibility.

Houston led the Western Illinois Leathernecks with 539 receiving yards on 36 catches and scored three touchdowns. As a senior, he was named first-team All-Missouri Valley Football Conference (MVFC) after leading the team with 43 receptions and 477 receiving yards with two touchdowns during the spring 2021 season, which was delayed from the fall due to the COVID-19 pandemic. In his final season with the Leathernecks, Houston caught 90 passes for 1,015 yards and six touchdowns and was again named first-team All-MVFC.

Professional career

Houston signed with the Dallas Cowboys as an undrafted free agent on May 3, 2022. He made the Cowboys' initial 53-man roster out of training camp. He was waived on September 20 and re-signed to the practice squad. He signed a reserve/future contract on January 25, 2023.

Legal issues
Houston and another football player were charged with aggravated sexual assault during his freshman season at Houston Baptist.

References

External links
Houston Baptist Huskies bio
Fullerton Hornets bio
Western Illinois Leathernecks bio
Dallas Cowboys bio

1999 births
Living people
American football wide receivers
Players of American football from San Antonio
Western Illinois Leathernecks football players
Dallas Cowboys players
Houston Christian Huskies football players
Fullerton Hornets football players